Harmon Seaside Links is a public golf course located in western Newfoundland in the town of Stephenville, Canada. The course was the first true links course in Canada and plays along the coast of the Gulf of St. Lawrence adjacent to Stephenville International Airport. The total length is around 6588 yards.

See also
List of golf courses in Newfoundland and Labrador

References

External links
Official website

Golf clubs and courses in Newfoundland and Labrador